Sarada darwini, Darwin's large fan-throated lizard, is a species of agamid lizard. It is endemic to India.

References

Sarada
Reptiles of India
Reptiles described in 2016
Taxa named by Veerappan Deepak